2012 Continental Championships may refer to:

African Championship
 Athletics: 2012 African Championships in Athletics

Asian Championships
 Football (soccer): 2012 AFC Champions League
 Weightlifting: 2012 Asian Weightlifting Championships
 Multisport: 2012 Asian Beach Games

European Championships
 Aquatics: 2012 European Aquatics Championships,
 Artistic Gymnastics: 2012 European Men's Artistic Gymnastics Championships
 Artistic Gymnastics: 2012 European Women's Artistic Gymnastics Championships
 Athletics: 2012 European Athletics Championships
 Figure Skating: 2012 European Figure Skating Championships
 Football (soccer): 2011–12 UEFA Champions League
 Football (soccer): 2011–12 UEFA Europa League
 Football (soccer): 2011–12 UEFA Women's Champions League
 Football (soccer): 2012 UEFA European Under-17 Football Championship
 Handball: 2012 European Men's Handball Championship
 Handball: 2012 European Women's Handball Championship
 Rhythmic Gymnastics: 2012 Rhythmic Gymnastics European Championships
 Taekwondo: 2012 European Taekwondo Championships
 Volleyball: Men's CEV Champions League 2011-12
 Volleyball: Women's CEV Champions League 2011-12
 Water Polo: 2012 Men's European Water Polo Championship
 Water Polo: 2012 Women's European Water Polo Championship
 Weightlifting: 2012 European Weightlifting Championships

Oceanian Championships
 Football (soccer): OFC Champions League 2011-12
 Swimming: 2012 Oceania Swimming Championships

Pan American Championship
 Judo: 2012 Pan American Judo Championships

North American Championship
 Football (soccer): 2011–12 CONCACAF Champions League

South American Championship
 Football (soccer): 2012 Copa Libertadores

See also
 Continental championship (disambiguation)